Constitutional Assembly elections were held in El Salvador in January 1939. At the time the country was a one-party state under the control of the National Pro Patria Party.

Results

References

Bibliography
Political Handbook of the world, 1939 New York, 1940.

El Salvador
Legislative elections in El Salvador
1939 in El Salvador
One-party elections
Election and referendum articles with incomplete results